The Phantom of the Opera is a pinball machine released by Data East in 1990. The game is based on the 1910 French novel The Phantom of the Opera by Gaston Leroux, but not based on the 1986 musical by Andrew Lloyd Webber or movie of the same name, although released around the same time. The game was designed by Joe Kaminkow and Ed Cebula.

Description
The game does not have very deep rules. Game rules are similar to other 1980s pinball machines. There are no modes to complete, the goal of the game is to try to score as much as possible.

Gameplay features include the Catwalk Ramp, a Magic Mirror, a Trap Door and an Organ that opens for Multi-Ball. The Phantom can be unmasked to reveal his true face on the backglass.

The art, music and lightshow give the pinball machine its fitting atmosphere. The Music uses Data East's stereo system. The richly detailed playfield was produced by art designer Paul Faris. Faris' daughter is the model for the character, Christine Daaé, on the backglass. Faris and his wife were previously the models for the backglass of the pinball machine Lost World.

Digital versions
The Phantom of the Opera is available as a licensed table in The Pinball Arcade and Stern Pinball Arcade. Data East logos are removed due to licensing issues.

References

External links
IPDB listing for Phantom of the Opera

Data East pinball machines
1990 pinball machines
Works based on The Phantom of the Opera